Barycnemis blediator is a small parasitic wasp. It lays its eggs in the larvae of the salt marsh rove beetle, Bledius spectabilis, which shows unusual behaviour for an insect in that it actively protects its young from the wasp.

References

Ichneumonidae
Insects described in 1970